Foundation for Student Housing in the Helsinki Region (HOAS) is the largest student housing provider operating in Greater Helsinki.

External links
HOAS - Official website

Education in Helsinki
Organisations based in Helsinki
Student housing